Lucas Emanuel López Dessypris (born 3 January 1994) is an Argentine footballer.

He has played for Deportes Magallanes and Rangers.

References
 
 

1994 births
Living people
Argentine footballers
Argentine expatriate footballers
Club Atlético Platense footballers
Rangers de Talca footballers
Chilean Primera División players
Expatriate footballers in Chile
Association football defenders
Footballers from Buenos Aires